The Collins Kids were an American rockabilly duo featuring Lawrencine "Lorrie" Collins (May 7, 1942 – August 4, 2018) and her younger brother Lawrence "Larry" Collins (born October 4, 1944). Their hits in the 1950s as youngsters, such as "Hop, Skip and Jump", "Beetle Bug Bop" and "Hoy Hoy", were geared towards children, but their infectious singing and playing crossed over generations. Larry, a lightning-fingered guitar whiz at age 10, was known for playing a double-neck Mosrite guitar like his mentor, Joe Maphis.

Career
The Collins Kids became regular performers on Town Hall Party in 1954 and on the syndicated for television version of the show, Tex Ritter's Ranch Party, which ran from 1957 to 1959. It was on Town Hall Party that Ricky Nelson first saw Lorrie Collins, and soon after they began dating. In a 1958 episode of The Adventures of Ozzie and Harriet, Lorrie played both Ricky's girlfriend - and that girlfriend's sister. Ricky unsuccessfully lobbied to make Lorrie a part of the show.

The Collins siblings continued to perform together in the mid-1960s, appearing as regulars on the Canadian music program Star Route and making a guest appearance on the 8 September 1965, edition of Shindig!.

Larry wrote a number of well-known songs including "Delta Dawn", "You're the Reason God Made Oklahoma", "Tulsa Turnaround"; some in partnership with songwriter Alexander Harvey.

The duo reunited for a rockabilly revival concert in England in 1993 and performed together until Lorrie's death in 2018. They appeared at Deke Dickerson's Guitar Geek Festival in Anaheim, California on January 19, 2008 with their nephew Dakota Collins, who played upright bass as an addition to the Collins band.

Selected discography 
 Rockin' Rollin' Collins Kids [LP] (Bear Family BFX-15074, 1981)
 The Collins Kids, Vol. 2 [LP] (Bear Family BFX-15108, 1983)
 Introducing Larry And Lorrie: The Collins Kids [LP/CD] (Epic PE-38457, 1983)
 Hop, Skip & Jump [2CD] (Bear Family BCD-15537, 1991)
 The Rockin'est [CD] (Bear Family BCD-16250, 1997)
 Rockin' And Boppin'  [CD] (Jasmine JASMCD-3709, 2018)

Notes

References

External links
 Recordings
 
  L.A. RECORD interview with The Collins Kids
 Encyclopedia of Oklahoma History and Culture - Collins Kids
 
 

1950s establishments in Oklahoma
2018 disestablishments in Oklahoma
American country music groups
+
Musical groups established in the 1950s
Musical groups disestablished in 2018
Child musical groups
Family musical groups
People from Creek County, Oklahoma
Rockabilly music groups
Sibling musical duos